Supercard of Honor V was the 5th Supercard of Honor professional wrestling event produced by Ring of Honor (ROH), which took place on May 8, 2010 at Manhattan Center in New York City, New York.

Storylines
Supercard of Honor V featured professional wrestling matches, which involved different wrestlers from pre-existing scripted feuds, plots, and storylines that played out on ROH's television programs. Wrestlers portrayed villains or heroes as they followed a series of events that built tension and culminated in a wrestling match or series of matches.

Results

See also	
2010 in professional wrestling

References

External links
 Ring of Honor's official website

2010 in professional wrestling
Ring of Honor pay-per-view events
Events in New York City
2010 in New York City
ROH Supercard of Honor
Professional wrestling in New York City
May 2010 events in the United States